Huidong may refer to:

Huidong County, Guangdong (惠东县), China
Huidong County, Sichuan (会东县), China